The Weißwandspitze is a mountain in the Stubai Alps on the border between Tyrol, Austria, and South Tyrol, Italy.

References 
 Heinrich Klier, Walter Klier: Alpenvereinsführer Stubaier Alpen. Rother Bergverlag, München 1980,

External links 

Mountains of the Alps
Mountains of Tyrol (state)
Mountains of South Tyrol
Alpine three-thousanders
Stubai Alps
Austria–Italy border
International mountains of Europe